Thurston Slaughter, known professionally as Crime Boss, is an American rapper formerly signed to Suave House Records.

Crime Boss debuted on 8Ball & MJG's album On the Outside Looking In in 1994. He signed with Suave House and issued his debut the following year entitled All in the Game. The album peaked at no. 113 on the Billboard 200. He followed up in 1997 with his most successful album, Conflicts & Confusion, released by Relativity Records, which went to no. 25 on the Billboard 200. Crime Boss left Suave House and released his third and final album, Still at Large in 1998 for his own Crime Lab Records. After Still at Large, Crime Boss appeared on Spice 1's 2000 album, The Last Dance and Sean T's 2001 album, Can I Shine?. After a brief hiatus, Crime Boss reappeared in 2020 on the music streaming site Spotify with his single "Chemical Imbalance 2.0."
In 1996, Crime Boss was arrested in Houston, found incompetent to stand trial, and sent to Vernon State Hospital, now known as North Texas State Hospital, in Vernon, Texas, until he was deemed competent to stand trial, several months later.

Discography

References

African-American rappers
Singers from Texas
Rappers from Houston
Suave House Records artists
Living people
Gangsta rappers
21st-century American rappers
Year of birth missing (living people)
21st-century African-American musicians